Jerzy Skolimowski (born 5 May 1938) is a Polish film director, screenwriter, dramatist, actor and painter. A graduate of the prestigious National Film School in Łódź, Skolimowski has directed more than twenty films since his 1960 début Oko wykol (The Menacing Eye). In 1967 he was awarded the Golden Bear prize for his film Le départ. Among his other notable films is Deep End (1970), starring Jane Asher and John Moulder Brown. 

He lived in Los Angeles for over 20 years where he painted in a figurative, expressionist mode and occasionally acted in films. He returned to Poland, and to film making as a writer and director, after a 17-year hiatus with Cztery noce z Anną (Four Nights with Anna) in 2008. 

He received the Golden Lion Award for Lifetime Achievement at the 2016 Venice Film Festival. His 2022 film EO was awarded the Jury Prize at the Cannes Film Festival and was nominated for the Academy Award for Best International Feature Film at the 95th Academy Awards.

Early life
Skolimowski was born in Łódź, Poland, the son of Maria (née Postnikoff) and Stanisław Skolimowski, an architect. He often recognized indications in his work to a childhood ineradicably scarred by the War. As a small child he witnessed the brutalities of war, even having been rescued from the rubble of a bombed-out house in Warsaw. His father, a member of the Polish Resistance, was executed by the German occupiers Nazis. His mother hid a Polish Jewish family in the house and Skolimowski recalls being required to take candy from German soldiers to maintain appearances.

After the war, his mother became the cultural attaché of the Polish embassy in Prague. His fellow pupils at school in Poděbrady, a spa town near Prague, included future film-makers Miloš Forman and Ivan Passer, as well as Václav Havel.

Skolimowski was considered as a trouble maker at school as he was the origin of many pranks which angered the authorities. At college he studied ethnography, history and literature and took up boxing, which was also the subject of a feature-length documentary, his first significant film. Skolimowski's interest in jazz and association with composer Krzysztof Komeda brought him into contact with actor Zbigniew Cybulski and directors Andrzej Munk and Roman Polanski.

Writer and actor
In his early twenties Skolimowski was already a writer, having published several books of poems, short stories and a play. Soon Skolimowski met Andrzej Wajda, the leading director of the then dominant 'Polish school' and twelve years his senior, who showed him a script for a film about youth written by Jerzy Andrzejewski, the author of the novel Ashes and Diamonds. Skolimowski was not impressed and dismissed the script. However, in response to a challenge by Wajda, he produced his own version which became a basis for the finished film,  Innocent Sorcerers  (1960), directed by Wajda with Skolimowski playing a boxer.

Skolimowski enrolled in the Łódź Film School with the intention of avoiding the long apprenticeship required before graduating to feature film direction. He used the film stock available to him for student exercises, and with initial advice from Andrzej Munk, he filmed over several years in such a way that the sequences were later clipped off and joined together into one piece of work. While scoring poorly in course work Skolimowski had a finished feature film by the end of the course.

Into the movie arena
Skolimowski then collaborated with Polański, writing the dialogue for the script of Knife in the Water (1962).

Between 1964 and 1984 he completed six semi-autobiographical feature films: Rysopis, Walkover, Barrier (1966), Hands Up! (completed 1967, released 1981), Moonlighting (GB 1982) and Success Is the Best Revenge, a segment in Dialóg and two other features Le Départ (1967) and Deep End based on his original screenplays. Barrier won Grand Prix at Bergamo International Film Festival. Le Départ won the Golden Bear at the 17th Berlin International Film Festival.

While living and working in many countries, he also completed another six relatively big budget productions, including four international co-productions, between 1970 and 1992 (The Adventures of Gerard, King, Queen, Knave, The Shout, The Lightship, Torrents of Spring and Ferdydurke), all distinctly bearing Skolimowski’s signature.

Film as life
After Barrier he left Poland to make Le Départ in Belgium in French. According to him Le Départ was a light film rather than a comedy, "does not have the serious layers that I like in my work." Skolimowski returned to Poland to make Ręce do góry (Hands Up!), the third film of the Andrzej trilogy and the fourth of his Polish sextet. The anti-Stalinist themes of Hands Up! resulted in that film being banned and him being effectively expelled from then communist Poland. He then resettled in London, notably having Jimi Hendrix as a neighbor in the same building.

Between Hands Up! and his next feature, Arthur Conan Doyle’s The Adventures of Gerard (1970), Skolimowski contributed a story to a Czech-produced portmanteau film, Dialóg 20-40-60 (1968), in which three different directors (with Zbyněk Brynych and Peter Solan) each devised their own story using identical dialogue even though the central characters in each section are separated in age by twenty years. Skolimowski's segment, "The Twenty Year Olds", would seem to be an extension of Le Départ with Jean-Pierre Léaud playing opposite Skolimowski's wife Joanna Szczerbic.

Deep End (1970) was Skolimowski's second non-Polish feature to be based on his own original screenplay. The movie with a coming of age storyline bears distinctive thematic similarities to Le Départ. His films The Shout (1978) and Moonlighting (1982) became critical successes, with Moonlighting, made in the UK and starring Jeremy Irons, the fifth of his Polish sextet, being critically and commercially his most successful film.

In the United States
The Lightship, Skolimowski’s first US production, was adapted from a novella by the German writer Siegfried Lenz and starring Robert Duvall and Klaus Maria Brandauer. Set on a US Coast Guard ship it was filmed in the North Sea. It is suspended between psychological duel with a doppelgänger theme and a pure performance piece within the stage-like confines of the lightship. However, even though receiving the best film award at the Venice Film Festival, The Lightship had only a very limited release.

Torrents of Spring (1989), adapted from a semi-autobiographical novella by Russian author Ivan Turgenev, was a big budget European co-production starring Timothy Hutton, Nastassja Kinski and Valeria Golino. It could be considered as Skolimowski's most impersonal 'generic' film, the only real departure from his expressed interest in making films only to please himself.

Skolimowski is also an actor, having appearances as Colonel Chaikov, a ruthless yet composed KGB colonel, in White Nights (1985) and Uncle Stepan, a Russian expatriate in Eastern Promises (2007), among other roles. In 2012, he appeared in The Avengers, as a villain interrogating Black Widow.

Later career

In 2008, he directed his first film after his return from America Cztery noce z Anną (Four Nights with Anna).

In 2010, he directed Essential Killing starring Vincent Gallo and Emmanuelle Seigner. The film won multiple awards including Special Jury Prize at the 67th Venice International Film Festival, Golden Ástor Award at the Mar del Plata International Film Festival and the Golden Lions Award for Best Film at the Gdynia Film Festival. In 2011, he became the recipient of the Commander's Cross of the Order of Polonia Restituta and the French Ordre des Arts et des Lettres.

In 2015, he directed thriller film 11 Minutes starring Richard Dormer and Andrzej Chyra. It was selected as the Polish entry for the Best Foreign Language Oscar at the 88th Academy Awards.

In July 2016, at the Venice International Film Festival, Skolimowski was honoured with the Golden Lion for "lifetime achievement".

His film EO premiered at the 2022 Cannes Film Festival where it won the Jury Prize. The Polish-Italian co-production is a contemporary interpretation of the 1966 drama film Au Hasard Balthazar directed by Robert Bresson. Submitted by Poland, EO was nominated for the Academy Award for Best International Feature Film at the 95th Academy Awards. In 2022, he co-wrote Roman Polański's upcoming drama film The Palace.

Filmography

Director
Walkover (Walkower) (1965)
Identification Marks: None (Rysopis) (1965)
Barrier (Bariera) (1966)
Le départ (The Departure) (1967)
Dialóg 20-40-60 (1968) (segment "The Twenty-Year-Olds")
Deep End (1970)
The Adventures of Gerard (1970)
King, Queen, Knave (1972)
The Shout (1978)
Hands Up! (Ręce do góry) (1981)
Moonlighting (1982)
Success Is the Best Revenge (1984)
The Lightship (1985)
Torrents of Spring (1989)
Ferdydurke (30 Door Key) (1991)
Four Nights with Anna (Cztery noce z Anną) (2008)
Essential Killing (2010)
11 Minutes (2015)
EO (2022)

Student shorts 

Little Hamlet (Hamles) (1960)
The Menacing Eye (Oko wykol) (1960)
Erotique (Erotyk) (1960)
Boxing (Boks) (1961)
Your Money or Your Life (Pieniądze albo życie) (1961)
Rzezba (1961)
The Nude (Akt) (1961)

Actor
Innocent Sorcerers (Niewinni czarodzieje) (1960)
Boks (1961)
Identification Marks: None (Rysopis) (1964) as Andrzej Leszczyc
Walkover (1965) as Andrzej Leszczyc
Sposob bycia (1966) as Leopold
Deep End (1970) as a man with newspaper
Ręce do góry (1981) as Andrzej Leszczyc
Circle of Deceit (1981) as Hoffmann
White Nights (1985) as KGB Colonel Chaiko
Big Shots (1987) as Doc
Torrents of Spring (1989) as Victor Victorovich
Mars Attacks! (1996) as Dr. Zeigler
L.A. Without a Map (1998)
Before Night Falls (2000)
Eastern Promises (2007) as Stepan
The Avengers (2012) as Georgi Luchkov
The Day of the Siege: September Eleven 1683 (2012) as Jan III Sobieski

Awards

See also
Polish cinema
List of Poles

References

The Demons of Modernity: Ingmar Bergman and European Cinema, John Orr, Berghahn Books, 2014.

External links

Jerzy Skolimowski at culture.pl 
Senses of Cinema: Great Directors Critical Database
 
 'Two Paths, Little Glory For This Polish Director', Anthony Paletta, The Wall Street Journal, 14 June 2011
 External Wandering, Michael Atkinson, movingimagesource.us
 Finding Zen in Poland: An Interview with Jerzy Skolimowski, Ben Sachs and Ignatiy Vishnevetsky, MUBI
 Photographs and literature on Jerzy Skolimowski

1938 births
Living people
Łódź Film School alumni
Polish male actors
20th-century Polish dramatists and playwrights
Polish male dramatists and playwrights
Polish film directors
Polish screenwriters
Film people from Łódź
People from Łódź Voivodeship (1919–1939)
German Film Award winners
Directors of Golden Bear winners
Cannes Film Festival Award for Best Screenplay winners